Hangman's Noose (French: Le collier de chanvre) is a 1940 French mystery film directed by Léon Mathot and starring Jacqueline Delubac, André Luguet and Annie Vernay. It is based on the 1932 novel Rope to Spare by Philip MacDonald about the detective Anthony Gethryn and is set in England.

The film's sets were designed by the art director Émile Duquesne.

Main cast
 Jacqueline Delubac as Lady Gladys Carter-Fawcett
 André Luguet as Gethryn
 Annie Vernay as Lucy Gethryn
 Georges Lannes as Le colonel Raverscourt
 Sylvia Bataille as Anny, la serveuse
 Paul Azaïs as Dollboys
 Georges Grey as Le capitaine Herbert Lake
 Marcel Carpentier as Dyson
 Georges Bever as L'inspecteur Pike
 Thomy Bourdelle as Bronson
 Suzanne Guémard as La femme du baron
 Marthe Mellot as La mère de Dollboys

References

Bibliography 
 Dayna Oscherwitz & MaryEllen Higgins. The A to Z of French Cinema. Scarecrow Press, 2009.

External links 
 

1940 mystery films
French mystery films
1940 films
1940s French-language films
Films directed by Léon Mathot
Films based on British novels
French films based on plays
Films set in London
French black-and-white films
1940s French films